Eau Claire River is the name of several rivers in North America, including:

Three rivers in Wisconsin in the United States:
Eau Claire River (Chippewa River), a tributary of the Chippewa River
Eau Claire River (St. Croix River), a tributary of the St. Croix River (Wisconsin-Minnesota)
Eau Claire River (Wisconsin River), a tributary of the Wisconsin River

See also 
Eau Claire (disambiguation)